Lubino  is a settlement in the administrative district of Gmina Bobolice, within Koszalin County, West Pomeranian Voivodeship, in north-western Poland.

See also
 History of Pomerania

References

Lubino